The Protector RWS is a remotely controlled weapons station (RWS) that can be mounted to vehicles and stationary platforms. It has been in full scale production since December 2001. It is manufactured by Kongsberg Defence & Aerospace of Norway.

Design
The system consists of a stabilized firing platform, a fire-control system and control grips. Several weapons can be mounted to the platform, such as:
 M2 Browning 12.7x99 .50 BMG heavy machine gun
 NSV 12.7x108 heavy machine gun
 M240/FN MAG 7.62×51mm NATO general-purpose machine gun
 M249/FN Minimi 5.56×45mm NATO light machine gun
 MK19 40×53 mm automatic grenade launcher
 H&K GMG 40×53 mm automatic grenade launcher
 XM307 Advanced Crew Served Weapon
 Javelin anti-tank guided missile
 Hellfire anti-tank guided missile (from a modified Protector)

Versions
Several versions of Protector have been developed with more than 20,000 units sold around the world in service with 23 countries. Between the M151 and M153 variants KONGSBERG has delivered more than 18,000 systems to the U.S. Armed Services. These systems are in-service within every branch of the U.S. military and many US agencies.

Overview
The Protector family includes the RS2, RS4 and RS6 Remote Weapon Stations, with weapons from light machine guns (5.56mm) to light cannons (30mmx113mm M230 chain gun). It also includes the Remote Turrets, designed for medium caliber cannons like 30mmx173mm and 40mmx180mm (Mk44 Bushmaster II).

M151 versions
 M151 Protector – deployed with the first Stryker brigades
 M151 E1 (Block 1) – includes improved thermal cameras
 M151 E2 (Block 2) – stabilized version
 Several country specific adaptations
 Weight (kg): 135
 Height (mm): 749
 Operating temperature (in °Celsius): -46 to +65
 Storage temperature (in °Celsius): -51 to +71
The system also features 4 M6 Smoke Grenade Dischargers. Specifications (excluding weapons and ammo):

M153 Protector
M153 Protector is designed to meet CROWS II requirement. Specifications (excluding weapons and ammo):
 Weight (kg): 172
 Height (mm): 762
 Operating temperature (in °Celsius): -46 to +65
 Storage temperature (in °Celsius): -51 to +71

Other variants
Protector Lite
Protector Lite is a lightweight version for 7.62 mm machine gun with 200 rounds of ammunition carried.
Protector Super Lite
The Super Lite is fully stabilized and adaptable to any wheeled, tracked or stabilized platform, including tripods.
Protector Medium Caliber RWS
Protector Medium Caliber RWS is designed as a vehicle turret for 20 to 50 mm autocannons, with coaxial machinegun of 5.56 to 7.62 mm. Specifications (including weapons and ammo):
Sea Protector

Sea Protector is developed for naval applications.:
In operation, maximum azimuth slew rate >100°/s, with maximum elevation slew Rate >50°/s. Range of Elevation -20° to +60°
Protector Dual RWS
Protector Dual RWS mounts two weapons. It provides a dual user functionality (Gunner / Commander). The coaxial weapon is mounted on the same axis as the main gun.
Protector with Non Lethal Effectors
Protector with Non Lethal Effectors is designed to close a capability gap in peacekeeping, peace enforcement and humanitarian operations as well as today's asymmetric warfare.
Protector Nordic
Protector Nordic is claimed by the Norwegian remote weapon station developer as the most technically advanced Protector RWS ordered to date, and is a key element in the foundation for cooperation in the Nordic material programs. The extended functionality includes the Day Camera VIS 95 with 95 field of view and the Infrared Aim Laser (850 nm), both developed by Kongsberg.
Protector NM221
Protector NM221 includes internal ammunition feed.

Users

 – ASLAV PC vehicle
 – Currently installed on the RG-31 and TAPV fleet. Additional units are on order for integration on the ACSV fleet, with deliveries starting in late 2020.
 – Patria AMV, 175 
 – LMV
 – CV90 family
 – Patria AMV vehicle
 – Renault VAB
 – TATA Kestrel
 – Unknown
 – Mowag Piranha IIIH CRV and RG-32M LTV
 – Currently only a few for testing
  – VBL Mk 2
 – Dingo 2 vehicle
 – Boxer vehicle
 – Unknown
 – CV90 family (Protector Nordic), NM205F3 APC (Protector NM221), Iveco LMV (Protector Lite), Fridtjof Nansen-class frigate (Sea Protector), HNoMS Maud and Skjold-class corvette (Sea Protector)
 – Pandur II
 – Unknown
 – Patria AMV
 – Piranha I vehicle cdmt, Mowag Duro IIIP and canot-patrouilleur 16
 – Sisu Pasi, Patria AMV, ARCHER Artillery System, RG-32M
 – Unknown
 – Unknown
  – used on Mastiff vehicles in Iraq and Afghanistan, Ajax family of vehicles
 – Stryker, M1A2 Abrams, and numerous other vehicles
 – to be used on 490 VCBI IFVs.
 – used on Joint Light Tactical Vehicles.
 – Used on Piranha V vehicles.

Gallery

References

External links

 Kongsberg Protector RWS webpage

Vehicle weapons
Remote weapon stations
Kongsberg Gruppen
Goods manufactured in Norway
Goods manufactured in France
Military equipment introduced in the 2000s